Zambezi is a town in the North-Western Province of Zambia, lying on the Zambezi River and the M8 road, west of Kabompo.  It is known for the palaces of the chiefs of the Lunda and Lovale people. Until about 1966 it was called Balovale after the dominant chief (and his village within the town is still known by that name) but the name was changed in an attempt to defuse tensions between the main groups and the government of the newly independent country. 

The Chinyingi Suspension Bridge spans the river just to the north-west of the town.

Climate

References

Populated places in North-Western Province, Zambia